Thomas McCormick (8 August 1890 – 6 July 1916) was an Irish professional boxer. Competing from 1911 to 1915, he held the British and Empire welterweight titles in 1914.

Boxing career highlights
On 9 January 1914 McCormick took the British Commonwealth and British Welterweight Title from Johnny Summers in twenty rounds in Sydney, Australia. He lost the title on 21 March 1914 to South London born Jewish boxer Mat Wells in twenty rounds, again in Sydney, Australia. Wells had been a British Lightweight champion and an Olympic Boxing contender who made it to the semi-finals in London in the summer of 1916.

On 24 January 1914 he took the World Welterweight title from Waldemar Holberg at Baker's Pavilion in Melbourne, Australia.

On 10 May 1915 McCormick made another attempt at the British Welterweight title at the National Sporting Club, Covent Garden in London, but lost to title holder Johnny Basham in a hard fought thirteenth round TKO.

Death in World War I
McCormick was killed in action on 6 July 1916 while serving in the 12th battalion of the Manchester Regiment in France during World War I.

His grave is unknown and his name is inscribed on the Thiepval Memorial to the Missing, Pier and Face 13 A and 14 C.

Professional boxing record

See also
Lineal championship
List of welterweight boxing champions

Notes

References

External links

Image - Tom McCormick

Major titles

|- 

|- 

|- 

1890 births
1916 deaths
Military personnel from County Louth
British military personnel killed in World War I
People from Dundalk
Welterweight boxers
Irish male boxers
British Army personnel of World War I
Manchester Regiment soldiers